The Venezuela Defense of Human Rights and Civil Society Act of 2014 (S. 2142) is a United States law used to impose targeted sanctions on certain individuals in Venezuela that were responsible for violations of human rights of antigovernment protesters during the 2014 Venezuelan protests. The law is also used to strengthen civil society in Venezuela, and for other purposes.

The ACT was extended in 2016 to expire on 31 December 2019.

Procedural history
The bill was introduced by Senator Robert Menendez on March 13, 2014. It was then passed by the Senate on December 7, 2014 and passed the House on December 10, 2014 to be signed into law by President Barack Obama. On December 18, 2014, President Obama signed the bill into law.

Actions 
On February 2, 2015, the United States Department of State imposed visa restrictions on current and former Venezuelan officials that were allegedly linked to presumed human rights abuses and political corruption. The visa restrictions also included family members of those involved in the allegations, with the Department of State saying, "We are sending a clear message that human rights abusers, those who profit from public corruption, and their families are not welcome in the United States".

March 2015
On 9 March 2015, Obama ordered the United States Department of the Treasury to freeze property and assets of the following individuals:

Benavides Torres, Antonio José: commander in the Venezuelan armed forces and former leader of the Venezuelan National Guard
Bernal Martínez, Manuel Gregoria: former Director General of SEBIN
González López, Gustavo Enrique: Director General of SEBIN
Haringhton Padron, Katherine Nayarith: national-level prosecutor in Venezuela
Noguera Pietri, Justo José: former General Commander of Venezuela’s National Guard
Pérez Urdaneta, Manuel Eduardo: Director of the Bolivarian National Police
Vivas Landino, Miguel Alcides: Inspector General of the Venezuelan armed forces

See also
List of bills in the 113th United States Congress
Corruption in Venezuela
Human rights in Venezuela
International sanctions during the Venezuelan crisis

References

Acts of the 113th United States Congress
United States–Venezuela relations
International reactions to the crisis in Venezuela
2014 Venezuelan protests